John William Murrell (23 June 1901 – 3 June 1980) was an Australian rules footballer who played with Geelong in the Victorian Football League (VFL).

Family
The son of Ambrose Murrell (1856-1946), and Helen Harriet Murrell (1861-1948), née Cuthbertson, John William Murrell was born at Geelong on 23 June 1901.

He married Beatrice Alice "Trixie" Calvert (1903-1990), at St John's Anglican Church, New Town, Tasmania, on 30 December 1926.

Education
He was educated at the Geelong High School and the Gordon Institute of Technology.

Engineer
He was a qualified hydraulic engineer.

Military service
He also served in the Navy in World War I.

Death
He died in Adelaide on 3 June 1980.

Notes

References
 
 World War One Service Record (a): John William Murrelll (387), National Archives of Australia.
 World War One Service Record (b): John William Murrelll (387), National Archives of Australia.

External links 
 
 
 Jack Murrell's profile at Redlegs Museum (Norwood)

1901 births
1980 deaths
Royal Navy personnel of World War I
Australian rules footballers from Victoria (Australia)
Geelong Football Club players
Glenorchy Football Club players
Norwood Football Club players